Kahama is an administrative ward in Kahama Urban District, Shinyanga Region, Tanzania with a postcode number 37304.In 2016 the Tanzania National Bureau of Statistics report there were 7,189 people in the ward, from 6,621 in 2012.

The ward has 2 neighborhoods Namanga, and Igalilimi.

References 

Populated places in Shinyanga Region
Constituencies of Tanzania